Akhlesh Lakhtakia is Evan Pugh University Professor and Charles Godfrey Binder Professor of engineering science and mechanics at the Pennsylvania State University. His research focuses on electromagnetic fields in complex materials, such as sculptured thin films, chiral materials, bianisotropy and industrially scalable bioreplication, an emerging form of engineered biomimicry applied to harvesting of solar energy and pest eradication. His technique for visualization of latent fingerprints was covered in the NOVA documentary series "Forensics on Trial".

Family
Akhlesh Lakhtakia was born in Lucknow, India on July 1, 1957, to Servesh Kumar and Gayatri Devi Lakhtakia. He married Mercedes N. Scabbiolo in 1982, with whom he has a daughter named Natalya Sheetal Lakhtakia.

Education

He was schooled in Lucknow (St. Cathedral School), New Delhi (Cambridge School), and Lucknow (St. Francis' High School). Appearing for final examinations in November 1973, at the end of the 11th grade, he was awarded the
Indian School Certificate in 1974.

He obtained a Bachelor of Technology degree in Electronics Engineering from the Indian Institute of Technology (BHU), Varanasi in 1979; Master of Science and Doctor of Philosophy degrees in Electrical Engineering from the University of Utah, Salt Lake City, USA in 1981 and 1983, respectively.

Academic career
In 1983, Lakhtakia joined the faculty of the Pennsylvania State University, where he was elevated to the rank of Distinguished Professor of Engineering Science and Mechanics in January 2004. In 2006, he became the Charles Godfrey Binder (Endowed) Professor of Engineering Science and Mechanics. In 2018, he became an Evan Pugh University Professor.

He has published more than 840 journal articles; has contributed 27 chapters to research books and encyclopedias; has edited, co-edited, authored or co-authored 17 books and 20 conference proceedings; has reviewed for 159 journals; serves on the editorial boards of four electromagnetics journals; was the Editor-in-Chief of the international journal Speculations in Science and Technology from 1993 to 1995; and became the first editor-in-chief (2007-2013) of the online Journal of Nanophotonics
 published by SPIE from 2007.

Honors and awards
He served as an international lecturer for the International Commission for Optics and the Optical Society of America; was twice a visiting professor of physics at Universidad de Buenos Aires, a visiting professor of physics at the University of Otago,  a visiting fellow in mathematics at the University of Glasgow, and a visiting professor of physics at Imperial College London from 2004 to 2007; headed the IEEE EMC Technical Committee on Nonsinusoidal Fields from 1992 to 1994; and is a Fellow of  Optical Society of America, SPIE, American Physical Society,  American Association for the Advancement of Science, Institute of Electrical and Electronics Engineers,  the Institute of Physics (UK),  the Royal Society of Chemistry (UK), and the Royal Society of Arts (UK). He also served as the 1995 Scottish Amicable Visiting Lecturer in mathematics at the University of Glasgow.

He received the PSES Outstanding Research Award in 1996, the PSES Premier Research Award in 2008,  the PSES Outstanding Advising Award in 2005, and the PSEAS Outstanding Teaching Award in 2016. For his research on sculptured thin films and complex-medium electromagnetics, he received the Faculty Scholar Medal in Engineering in 2005, and a Doctor of Science degree in Electronics Engineering from the Banaras Hindu University in 2006. Nanotech Briefs recognized him in 2006 with a Nano 50 Award for Innovation. The University of Utah made him a Distinguished Alumnus in 2007, and the Indian Institute of Technology (BHU), Varanasi in 2014. He was named the winner of the  Technical Achievement Award for the year 2010 by SPIE, and of the Walston Chubb Award for Innovation for 
the year 2016 by Sigma Xi, for conceptualizing and developing sculptured thin films in diverse arenas.

Research areas 
His current research interests lie in the electromagnetics of complex materials, sculptured thin films, carbon nanotubes, nanoengineered metamaterials, biomimetics (especially bioreplication), forensic science, and negative refraction. At Penn State, he co-developed a course on green engineering for undergraduate engineering students, as well as a course on fundamentals of engineering principles and design for pre-service elementary schoolteachers.

Religious views 
Dr. Lakhtakia is an atheist but he derives inspiration from the Bhagavad Gita and the Sermon on the Mount.

Books

 Time-Harmonic Fields in Chiral Media (1989).
Selected Papers on Natural Optical Activity (1990).
Essays on the Formal Aspects of Electromagnetic Theory (1992).
Beltrami Fields in Chiral Media (1994).
Selected Papers on Linear Optical Composite Materials(1996).
Models and Modelers of Hydrogen (1996).
Electromagnetic Fields in Unconventional Materials and Structures (2000).
Introduction to Complex Mediums for Optics and Electromagnetics (2003).
Nanometer Structures: Theory, Modeling, and Simulation (2004).
Sculptured Thin Films: Nanoengineered Morphology and Optics (2005).
Selected Papers on Nanotechnology--Theory and Modeling (2006).
Optical Guided-wave Chemical and Biosensors I (2010).
Optical Guided-wave Chemical and Biosensors II (2010).
Nanotechnology: A Crash Course (2010).
Engineered Biomimicry (2013).
Electromagnetic Surface Waves: A Modern Perspective (2013).
Modern Analytical Electromagnetic Homogenization (2015).
The World of Applied Electromagnetics: In Appreciation of Magdy Fahmy Iskander (2018).
Infinite-Space Dyadic Green Functions in Electromagnetism (2018).
Electromagnetic Anisotropy and Bianisotropy: A Field Guide (2nd Edition) (2019).
The Transfer-Matrix Method in Electromagnetics and Optics (2020).

References

Categories

1957 births
Scientists from Lucknow
Indian emigrants to the United States
University of Utah alumni
Pennsylvania State University faculty
Living people
Fellows of the American Physical Society
Fellow Members of the IEEE
Fellows of Optica (society)
Fellows of the American Association for the Advancement of Science
Fellows of the Royal Society of Chemistry
Fellows of the Institute of Physics
Fellows of SPIE
American electrical engineers
Electrical engineering academics
Optical engineers